The Ted Lindsay Award, formerly known as the Lester B. Pearson Award, is awarded annually to the National Hockey League's most outstanding player in the regular season as judged by the members of the NHL Players' Association. First awarded in 1971, it is a companion to the Hart Memorial Trophy, which is awarded to the League's Most Valuable Player, as judged by members of the Professional Hockey Writers' Association. The award was renamed in 2010 after Ted Lindsay of the Detroit Red Wings.

History
The award was first handed out at the conclusion of the 1970–71 NHL season. It was named in honour of Lester B. Pearson, who was Prime Minister of Canada from 1963 to 1968, the recipient of the 1957 Nobel Peace Prize, and a former player and coach for the University of Toronto Varsity Blues men's ice hockey team.

On April 29, 2010, the National Hockey League Players' Association announced that the award would be reintroduced as the Ted Lindsay Award to honor Hall of Famer Ted Lindsay for his skill, tenacity, leadership, and role in establishing the original Players' Association.  The voting for the trophy is conducted at the end of the regular season by the members of the NHL Players Association.

Wayne Gretzky won the award five times during his career. Members of the Pittsburgh Penguins and Edmonton Oilers have won the award ten times each. The Lindsay Award is considered to be the companion of the Hart Memorial Trophy—eighteen players have won both trophies for the same season: Guy Lafleur, Gretzky, Mario Lemieux, Mark Messier, Brett Hull, Sergei Fedorov, Eric Lindros, Dominik Hasek, Jaromir Jagr, Joe Sakic, Martin St. Louis, Sidney Crosby, Alexander Ovechkin, Evgeni Malkin, Carey Price, Patrick Kane, Connor McDavid, Nikita Kucherov, Leon Draisaitl, and Auston Matthews. Of those eighteen, only Lafleur, Gretzky, Lemieux, Jagr, St. Louis, Crosby, Ovechkin, Malkin, Kane, McDavid, Kucherov and Draisaitl have also won the Art Ross Trophy for the same season and completed a Hart-Pearson/Lindsay-Art Ross sweep, (while Hasek and Price are the only goaltenders to win the Hart-Pearson/Lindsay double to date) and Bobby Orr won the Norris-Pearson-Art Ross Triple and is the only defenceman to win the Pearson/Lindsay). Of that list, only Ovechkin has also won the Maurice "Rocket" Richard Trophy for top goal-scorer in the same year, completing what is to date the only Hart-Pearson-Art Ross-Richard sweep. Had the Richard Trophy existed formally during the years they completed their Hart-Pearson-Art Ross sweeps, however, Lafleur would have achieved the four-award sweep once, Lemieux twice, and Gretzky five times. Brett Hull and Auston Matthews join Ovechkin, Lafleur, Lemieux, and Gretzky, as the only players to complete the three part Hart-Pearson/Lindsay-goal scoring leader sweep.

Winners

See also
List of National Hockey League awards
List of NHL players
List of NHL statistical leaders

References

General
Ted Lindsay Award at NHL.com
Ted Lindsay Award history at Legends of Hockey.net

Specific

National Hockey League trophies and awards
Awards established in 1971
Most valuable player awards